is a Japanese manga artist, who is best known for his work on the SD Gundam series.

Works
 Shageki Boy SHOOT (1998)
 War War Tanks! (2000)
 Brave Saga 2 (2000)
 SD Gundam Mushamaruden (2001)
 SD Gundam Mushamaruden 2 (2002)
 SD Gundam Mushamaruden 3 (2003)
 SD Gundam Force Emaki Musharetsuden (2004)
 SD Gundam Force: Destructive Daishogun Appears!!Zako? (2004)
 SD Gundam Musha Banchō Fūunroku (2006-2008)
 Fusion Chronicle Gundam Battle Rave (2008)
 Jyuuken Sentai Gekiranger VS Boukenger

Design
Gundam Evolve 10: refine design of ZZ Gundam
Gundam Evolve 14: Musha Gundam

Recurring themes
With Ichishiki's SD Gundam works, there are many recurring elements. These include:
The lead Gundam being a pre-teen with a fiery temper
The first human to encounter the lead Gundam is a human boy of similar age
Artificial Gundams, with cog designs in their eyes to signify their robotic nature

SD Gundam
Manga artists
1971 births
Living people